Parotocinclus jacksoni is a species of catfish in the family Loricariidae. It is native to South America, where it occurs in the Mamanguape River basin in Brazil. The species is known to inhabit clean, fast-flowing rivers marginally vegetated by shrubs and trees, in areas with a substrate of rocks, gravel, and sand. It reportedly coexists with a variety of other fishes in its environment, including representatives of the genera Astyanax, Characidium, Compsura, Crenicichla, Hoplias, Hypostomus, Leporinus, Poecilia, Rhamdia, Serrapinnus, Steindachnerina, and Triportheus. The species reaches 4.2 cm (1.7 inches) SL and was described in 2021 by T. Ramos, S. Y. Lustosa-Costa, Luciano F. Barros-Neto, and J. E. Barbosa on the basis of morphological characteristics.

References 

Loricariidae
Taxa named by Telton Pedro Anselmo Ramos
Fish described in 2021